Los Vecinos en Guerra also stylized as Vecinos en Guerra is an Argentine television comedy produced by Underground Contenidos and Endemol which premiered on April 15, 2013 and ended on January 2, 2014. It is written by Ernesto Korovsky, Silvina Frejdkes and Alejandro Quesada, is an original idea of Sebastián Ortega. With the integral management of Miguel Colom. Starring Diego Torres, Eleonora Wexler, Mike Amigorena and Mónica Antonópulos. Co-Starring Candela Vetrano, Gastón Soffritti and Marco Antonio Caponi. The antagonistic participations of Juan Gil Navarro, Marcela Kloosterboer and Luis Ziembrowski. The star performances by the first actors Hugo Arana and Mirta Busnelli.

Plot

First stage: chapters 1-63 
Mercedes (Eleonora Wexler), She is a housewife of almost 40 years, who 20 years ago was part of a group of scammers and nobody in her current life knows about this. In the past her name was Lisa and she worked with Álex (Mike Amigorena), who recruited her for this type of tasks and became her first love, and with Ciro (Luis Ziembrowski) with whom he planned and financed the scams. A robbery failed and the group disbanded. Mercedes, with a changed identity, began a new life away from scams. She married Rafael (Diego Torres) and they had 3 children, Paloma (Candela Vetrano), Teo (Román Almaraz) and Juana, who know absolutely nothing about their past, while living a normal life. One morning that seemed to be like any other, they discover that a new family, the Mayorga, moves to the most luxurious and sought-after house in the neighborhood. Mercedes, seeing them, is shocked and discovers that the family man is neither more nor less than Álex, her former love and partner in the thefts whom she believed dead. Ciro leaves prison after 20 years, and begins serving house arrest. He seeks revenge from his former partners for the crime he blames for having been imprisoned from his residence. The return of Álex to the life of Mercedes aims to conquer it again and to achieve its purpose he is in charge of hiring a group of actors to pretend to be a normal family and thus, be able to be close to Mercedes without attracting attention. One morning, Rafael is summoned to the office of his boss, Alberto Mercado (Antonio Gasalla) and inform him that he is fired. When he leave the company, Rafael is in a car crash with Carolina (Marcela Kloosterboer) and she offers him help and a job in her father's company. Carolina suffers from a mental illness, so she begins to become obsessed with Rafael to the point of approaching his family. After some problems with Carolina, Rafael is sincere with his wife and tells her the whole truth, so she gets upset. But Rafael later becomes angry when Mercedes reveals that Álex was her partner. From then on, the rivalry between him and Álex Mayorga grows even more. At that time, Paloma had started a relationship with Alex's supposed son, Lucas (Gastón Soffritti) and becomes pregnant with Lucas. That was undoubtedly the hardest blow for Rafael. Álex goes to a place to face Rafael face to face, but apparently he is killed in his car and when Rafael arrives he is not there.

Second stage: chapters 64-90
Investigating, police and prosecutor Eduardo Germano (Guillermo Pfening) they discover a shirt with Alex's blood in Rafael's car and he is accused as the murderer. To help him, Fernando (Marco Antonio Caponi) his cousin hires a lawyer, Mariano Sánchez Ginastera (Juan Gil Navarro), who manages to release him from the case. He falls in love with Mercedes and tries to conquer her, but discovers that she was a scammer, through the information that Gasparini (Alejandro Fiore) gets him. Some time later, Álex's lifeless body appears, but the time he has been dead, according to the autopsy, does not coincide with the time he has been missing, since it appeared that he had died 48 hours ago and Alex had been missing for 2 months. Fernando begins to suspect and then, through Roque's (Chang Sung Kim) mouth he discovers that Álex's crime was just a planned staging by these last two, since Álex had many debts and threatened to kill him, so he simulates his own murder in order to escape to Greece and make Rafa look like the murderer . But only two months later Álex returned to Argentina to be close to Mercedes, but at that time he met Mariano and was later killed by the latter, which Roque would discover later and immediately alerted Fernando of this. Meanwhile, Fernando and Ivana (Mónica Antonópulos), they decide to investigate Mariano. Ivana finds a photo of Mariano and Álex as partners in adolescence and that increases her suspicions that Mariano may have something to do with the death of Álex, so he decides to make the complaint, but the lawyer, after discovering that she has that photo in his possession, sends Gasparini to bring her by force to his house and takes her to a room with him. Mariano confesses that he murdered Alex and burns the photograph, fearing for his life, Ivana tries to escape, but is caught by Mariano and in the midst of a hard struggle he leaves her unconscious by hitting her head against the railing of the stairs, the takes to the ground floor and once there and in a desperate situation he murders her.

Third stage: chapters 91-135 
Fernando is convinced that Mariano is responsible for the death of his girlfriend and begins to seek evidence that incriminate him with the former partner of Álex, Roque, and later also with the prosecutor Gerardo Rosales (Ariel Staltari). Soon Mariano begins to borrow from Gasparini for the information he provided and that is why he threatens to tell Fernando the truth of Ivana's death, he even quotes him, but when Fernando arrives at his house he finds him dead, now that Mariano killed him to prevent him from speaking. Everyone in the neighborhood has a bad feeling about Mariano, but Mercedes thinks otherwise, until, when she was alone in his house, she finds a shoe in a drawer and she thinks she saw it before. Mariano comes to suspect that Mercedes lost confidence in him and decides to commit suicide, but she stops him. Since then, Mercedes understands that everyone was right about Mariano. When she goes to Ivana's house, in her belongings, she finds the other shoe that was in Mariano's house and confirms her suspicions, he murdered Ivana. She apologizes to Fernando for not believing him and makes a pact with Rosales, if he help her catch Mariano, she will not assume the charges for the scams she made in the past. But this brings her a complication, since not being able to say anything to Rafael and her friends, everyone thinks that Mariano it more important than her own family, Rafael reaching the point of not letting her see her children. After Mercedes managed to get what she needed, Mariano discovers that it was she who stole that information and handed it to Rosales. Then he goes crazier than ever and forces Meredes to go home and tells her that he already knows what she did, then he drug her and then knocks her out. While they go to his house, Fernando tells Rafael the truth and when they arrive, Mariano threatens to kill Mercedes, in that he shoots Rafael, but Fernando gets in the middle to protect his cousin and receives the shot, but being on the ground manages to shoot Mariano twice, in the leg and chest respectively, and falls collapsed in the pool, later, both Fernando and Mariano are rushed to the hospital, Fernando enters a coma and Mariano kills a nurse and manages to circumvent the safety of the clinic and escape. Once released, he calls Mercedes threatening to kill her children and Rafael. On the other hand, Fernando, after having awakened from the coma is still hospitalized, and again Mariano mocks the security to enter the clinic, once in Fernando's room, Mariano drugs Silvina with chloroform to sleep her and then tries to kill Fernando by suffocating him with a pillow, but Reina gets in the middle and manages to save Fernando but is almost hanged by Mariano, at that moment Silvina reacts and starts screaming, Mariano manages to escape again and when the police arrive it's late. That same night, Rafael decides that it is best for him and his family to move to other home for security reasons. The next day Mercedes receives a call from Mariano, telling her that he has Rafael as a prisoner in an abandoned factory and that unless he wants to kill him she must go to that place alone, before leaving she puts up a knife and leaves to the place, Once there, she finds Rafael tied to a pole and all hurt, when she is going to untie him Mariano appears pointing her with a gun, he is sure that she is armed so he asks her to take off all the weapons she may have, a Once done, at the request of Mariano, she kneels, and manages to take the weapon away from him and this time it is Rafael who takes it, points it and threatens to kill him, this time in a distraction from Rafael, Mariano pounces on him trying to remove the weapon, but in the middle of the struggle he turns his back against an iron tube, it crosses his chest and ends his life.

Fourth Stage: chapters 136-146 
After Mariano's death, Mercede's family returns to peace, Paloma gives birth to her son Pedro while Mimi and Helen's brother have their big wedding. But later the peace of mind ends when the prosecutor appears again informing that there is no agreement with Mecha and this will have to go to prison for the scams he made in the past. Mercedes is a fugitive from justice and misses her family in her endless escape. Then, Fernando returns to his police position and is face to face with Mercedes about to arrest her but finally does not do it. Finally, Rafael launches a plan taking his family to a beach in Brazil to wait for Mercedes. A year later, Sonia lives in the neighborhood with Ramón, Reina sells the Mayorga mansion and begins a tour in a mobile home with Roque. Meanwhile, Rafael has a restaurant in Brazil called Mecha and lives in Brazil with his children, son-in-law and grandson. Later, Fernando tells Rafael that the case against Mercedes was withdrawn. Mercedes arrives in Brazil free of her past and reunites with Rafael to live a new beginning.

Reception
The 2013 prime time of Argentine television is highly disputed by the channels El Trece and Telefe. El Trece airs Solamente Vos and Farsantes, and Telefe airs Los Vecinos en Guerra and Celebrity Splash!, both channels with similar ratings.

Cast

Protagonists 
 Rafael Crespo Butilengo (Diego Torres) Businessman, Husband of Mercedes and Father of Paloma, Teo and Juana.
 Lisa Ramos/Mercedes "Mecha" Maidana (Eleonora Wexler) Ex-criminal, Wife of Rafael and Mother of Paloma, Teo and Juana.
 Alejo "Alex" López/Alejo "Alex" Mayorga (Mike Amigorena) Ex-Criminal and Ex-boyfriend of Mercedes. He create the Mayorga family. Ivana's supposed husband and Lucas's supposed father.
 Ivana Fernández/Ivana Barreiro (Mónica Antonópulos) Supposed wife of Álex, Supposed mother of Lucas and Supposed daughter of Ramón and Reina.

Co-protagonists 
 Lucas Galetto/Lucas Mayorga Barreiro (Gastón Soffritti) Supposed son of Ivana and Álex, Supposed grandson of Ramón and Reina, Boyfriend of Paloma and Father of Pedro.
 Paloma Crespo Maidana (Candela Vetrano) Daughter of Rafael and Mercedes, Older sister of Teo and Juana, Girlfriend of Lucas and Mother of Pedro.
 Fernando Vitelli  (Marco Antonio Caponi) He is Rafael's Cousin and Ex-Police.

Antagonists 
 Carolina del Río (Marcela Kloosterboer) A woman obsessed with Rafael.
 Mariano Sánchez Ginastera (Juan Gil Navarro) Lawyer and is in love with Mercedes.
 Ciro Nieto (Luis Ziembrowski) The former partner of Álex and Mercedes.

Recurring cast 
 Sonia Butilengo de Crespo (Mirta Busnelli) Mother of Rafael and Fernando's Aunt. 
 Nora "Norita" Sotelo (Jorgelina Aruzzi) Sister of Helen and Fabián, Coco's wife, Mother of Valentino and Friend of Mercedes.
 Helena "Helen" Sotelo (Carola Reyna) Sister of Nora and Fabián, Mother of Agustina and Friend of Mercedes.
 Miriam "Mimí" Bermejo (Lola Berthet) It's the Maid of Mercedes, Helen and Nora.
 Ramón Freire/Ramón Barreiro (Hugo Arana) Supposed husband of Reina, Supposed father of Ivana, Supposed grandfather of Lucas and helps Álex to devise the plan.
 Roque Dudú (Chang Sung Kim) Ciro's accomplice, spy on Mercedes and Álex. 
 Emilio/Reina (Juan Pablo Geretto) Supposed wife of Ramón, supposed mother of Ivana and Supposed grandmother of Lucas.
 Jorge "Coco" Dellamonica (Carlos Portaluppi) Dentist, Husband of Nora and Father of Valentino.
 Fabián Sotelo (Alan Sabbagh) Brother of Helen and Nora.
 Agustina "Agus" Joglar Sotelo (Sabrina Fogolini) Daughter of Helen, Valentino's cousin, Friend of Paloma and Girlfriend of Valeria.
 Valentino Dellamonica Sotelo (Lucio Rogati) Son of Coco and Nora, Agustina's cousin and Paloma's ex-boyfriend.
 Teo Crespo Maidana (Román Almaraz) Son of Rafael and Mercedes and Brother of Paloma and Juana.

Participations 
 Alberto Mercado (Antonio Gasalla) Rafael's former boss.
 Miguel del Río (Mario Pasik) Carolina's father.
 Benjamín "Tuca" Pardo (Mex Urtizberea) A man that Lucas and Paloma know in a bowling alley in Rosario.
 Lupe Villanueva (Emilia Attias) A young fashion designer, who falls in love with Rafael.
 Teresa Rodríguez (Susú Pecoraro) Reina's girlfriend, when she was Emilio.
 Mario Gasparini (Alejandro Fiore) A former convict whom Mariano took out of jail years ago. It was his right hand. He is crushed by a piece of furniture thrown by Mariano.
 Gustavo José Errico (Daniel Aráoz) Rafael's well-known television producer.
 Lorenzo "Lolo" Bermejo (Diego Mesaglio) Mimí's brother.
 Antonio "Tony" Ríos Salgado (Pablo Alarcón) Judge of the cooking contest and lover of Sonia.
 Sergio Bernal (Coraje Ábalos) Coco's dietitian and Dalma's new boyfriend.
 Luis Alberto (Emilio Disi) A scammer who knows Sonia at a meeting of Alcoholics Anonymous.
 Nicolás (Nazareno Casero) Lucas and Valeria's friend.
 Mullinqui (Mariano Argento) Mariano psychiatrist.
 María Ofelia Sacristán (Lucrecia Blanco) Officer in charge of the case of Ciro and Fernando's colleague.
 Carlos "Charly" Aguirre (Fabián Arenillas) Former owner of the house of the Mayorga.
 Dalma "La Gallega" Escudero (Sheila González) Coco's secretary and lover.
 Laura Pereyra (Victoria Carreras) Director of the school of Lucas and Paloma.
 Julián Pereyra (Tomás de las Heras) Coco's nephew and Paloma's second boyfriend.
 Norman Ramírez (Fernando Sily) Comedian and Businessman, who knows Rafael and his friends in a bar.
 Ana Rodríguez (Luz Cipriota) Daughter of Emilio and Teresa.
 Eduardo Patenza (Gabo Correa) Matías's father and Ana's father-in-law.
 Matías Alberto Patenza (Esteban Masturini) Ana's husband.
 Jimmy Oftrof (Gastón Ricaud) Lupe's ex-husband.
 Valeria "Vale" Acosta (Natalie Pérez) Lucas's ex-girlfriend and Agustina's girlfriend.
 Paula "Pauli" de Bregowi (Victoria Almeida) Fabián's ex-wife.
 Romina Piatti (Pamela Rodríguez) Police officer who works with Eduardo Germano.
 Eduardo Germano (Guillermo Pfening) Prosecutor of the Nation, responsible for the case of Álex.
 Gerardo Rosales (Ariel Staltari) Prosecutor investigating Mariano.
 Francisco "Pancho" Joglar (Marcelo Mazzarello) Helen's ex-husband and Agustina's father.
 Luciano "Rulo" Bermejo (Luciano Conti) Mimí's brother.
 Juan Carlos "Juanqui" Beltrán (Juan Pablo Mirabelli) Fan and President of the Fan Club of Sonia.
 Laura Garay (Carla Pandolfi) A patient of Coco.
 Silvina (Natalia Figueiras) Rafael's former coworker and Fernando's new girlfriend.
 Javier (Iván Espeche) Businessman and Coco's friend.
 'Martina (Lis Moreno) A girl who meets Fabián in a bar.
 Lautaro (Lucas Lagré) A patient of Coco.
 Manuela (Lola Bezerra) A model and friend of Lupe.
 Jimena (Florencia Miller) A model and friend of Lupe.
 Lucía (Andrea Estévez) A girl who Fernando and Fabián find in the street.
 Estela (Mónica Salvador) Matías's mother and Ana's mother-in-law.
 Pablo (Ernesto Korovsky) Shampoo advertising Director who records Fabián.
 Rodolfo (Luis Sabatini) A cellmate of Fernando while he was in prison.
 Nahuel (Agustín Pardella) a boy that Paloma knows in Mendoza when she was looking for where to spend the night.
 Alina (Florencia Benítez) Coco's new assistant and accomplice of Mariano.
 María (María Nela Sinisterra) Dalma's friend.
 Manuel (Mauricio Lavaselli) Appraiser that sends Sonia for the sale of the house of Rafael and Mercedes.
 Lila (Florencia Raggi) Rafael's partner in yoga class and Rafael's teenage friend.
 Anette (Carolina Barbosa) Sergio's wife.
 Yamila (Lara Ruiz) Yoga teacher of Rafael and Lila.
 Jony (Lucas Velasco) Agustina and Valeria's partner at the service station.
 Victoria (Carina Gallucci) Informant that Mariano puts to follow Rosales.
 Goyo (Harry Havilio) Lila's acquaintance with whom she  organizes a blind date with Sonia.
 Grimaldi (Néstor Zacco) Police officer who arrested Lucas, Paloma, Agustina and Valentino.
 Méndez (Claudio Rissi) Commissioner and head of Fernando, when he is reinstated by force.
 Beba (Natalia Cociuffo) Charly's wife.
 Michel Noher
 Fede Medina

Deaths

Awards

Nominations
 2013 Martín Fierro Awards
 Best comedy
 Best actor of daily comedy (Diego Torres)
 Best actor of daily fiction (Mike Amigorena)
 Best secondary actor (Mario Pasik)
 Best secondary actress (Mirta Busnelli)
 Best new actor or actress (Juan Pablo Geretto)

References

External links
 "Acción" para "Vecinos en guerra" 

2013 telenovelas
Telefe telenovelas
2013 Argentine television series debuts
2014 Argentine television series endings